Ludvig is a Scandinavian given name, the equivalent of English Lewis or Louis. People with the name include:

 Ludvig Almqvist, Swedish politician
 Ludvig Aubert, Norwegian Minister of Justice
 Ludvig Bødtcher, Danish lyric poet
 Ludvig G. Braathen, Norwegian shipping magnate and founder of the Braathens airline
 Ludvig Daae (disambiguation)
 Ludvig Engsund (born 1993), Swedish ice hockey goaltender
 Ludvig Faddeev, Russian theoretical physicist and mathematician
 Ludvig Gade, Director of Royal Danish Ballet 1877–1890
 Ludvig Hammarskiöld, Swedish officer and military historian
 Ludvig Hektoen, American pathologist
 Ludvig Holberg, Danish-Norwegian writer and playwright
 Ludvig Holstein-Holsteinborg, Danish politician
 Ludvig Holstein-Ledreborg, Danish politician
 Ludvig Mylius-Erichsen, Danish explorer
 Ludvig Nobel, Swedish engineer, businessman and  humanitarian 
 Ludvig Schytte, Danish composer, pianist, and teacher
 Ludvig Strigeus, Swedish programmer 

Danish masculine given names
Norwegian masculine given names
Swedish masculine given names